John William Holmdahl (April 18, 1924 – July 17, 2017) was a United States Democratic politician and a member of the California State Senate for the 16th district from 1959 to 1967 and the 8th district from 1971 to 1982.

Holmdahl was born in San Francisco and during World War II he served in the United States Army.  In 1955 he became a member of Oakland City Council, remaining on the council until 1958.  He was later a judge of the California Court of Appeal, retiring in 1982.

References

United States Army personnel of World War II
Oakland City Council members
1924 births
2017 deaths
Politicians from San Francisco
20th-century American politicians
Democratic Party California state senators